Latika Sharma is a member of the Haryana Legislative Assembly from the BJP representing the Kalka constituency  in the 2014 Haryana Legislative Assembly election as a member of the Bharatiya Janata Party.

References 

Living people
Bharatiya Janata Party politicians from Haryana
People from Panchkula
Haryana MLAs 2014–2019
Year of birth missing (living people)